Galina Yevgeniyevna Bogomolova (born 15 October 1977 in Beloretsk) is a Russian long-distance runner, who specializes in the 10,000 metres and the marathon.

In 1996, she finished in 12th place in the women's 5000 metres at the 1996 World Junior Championships in Athletics held in Sydney, Australia.

Bogomolova won the Rome City Marathon in 2008 in 2:22:53, which was the fastest marathon recorded in Italy at the time. Two years earlier she had set her personal best of 2:20:47, realized in the 2006 Chicago Marathon.

Bogomolova has also had success in cross country running: she took individual silver and team gold at the 2002 European Cross Country Championships and won the 2002 edition of the Lotto Cross Cup Brussels.

International competitions

Personal bests
1500 metres - 4:10.00 min (2004)
3000 metres - 8:42.03 min (2005)
5000 metres - 14:59.72 min (2004)
10,000 metres - 30:26.20 min (2003)
Half marathon - 1:10:34 hrs (2005)
Marathon - 2:21:58 hrs (2006)

References

External links

1977 births
Living people
Russian female long-distance runners
Russian female cross country runners
Russian female marathon runners
Olympic female marathon runners
Olympic athletes of Russia
Athletes (track and field) at the 2000 Summer Olympics
Athletes (track and field) at the 2004 Summer Olympics
Athletes (track and field) at the 2008 Summer Olympics
World Athletics Championships athletes for Russia
Russian Athletics Championships winners
People from Beloretsk
Sportspeople from Bashkortostan